Juan José de Vértiz y Salcedo (1719 in Mérida, Yucatán – 1799 in Madrid, Spain) was a Spanish colonial politician born in New Spain, and Viceroy of the Río de la Plata.

Biography
Son of a prominent peninsular politician, he studied in Spain and had a military education, serving in several Spanish campaigns, such as in Italy and France. He held the post of Governor of Buenos Aires, under the administration of the Viceroyalty of Perú and Viceroyalty of Río de la Plata, having as his main priority to expel the Portuguese from the Banda Oriental, present-day Uruguay, without success. Nevertheless, his government was highly praised.

He assumed the post of Viceroy in 1778, having had a wide set of accomplishments, developing a local economy, colonizing uninhabited lands (or inhabited by local natives), establishing local government (Intendencias) all over the viceroyalty and prepared the way to the foundation of the  Real Audiencia de Buenos Aires. He enacted the royal rulings that helped to boost commerce, and open the customs. As his social work, he tried to group artisans in trade unions, mimicking the European system. During his administration, he established the first city census, which at the time showed about 37,000 inhabitants. He also created the first theatre in the city: La Ranchería.

He open the "Casa Cuna" or "Hospital de expósitos", with the purpose of giving shelter to homeless children. This institution was founded by the jesuits. He also created the "Protomedicato" to watch the practice of medicine and prevent the pactise of curanderism. This institution was ruled by Miguel Gorman, and started the teaching of medicine in Buenos Aires.

He played an important role in the repression of the uprising of Túpac Amaru II in Perú. In 1784 he asked to return to Spain, leaving the viceroyalty and giving it to his successor Nicolás del Campo. He died in Spain in 1799.

Bibliography

References

1719 births
1799 deaths
People from Mérida, Yucatán
Viceroys of the Río de la Plata
Spanish colonial governors and administrators